Radical Illustrators was a one-off issue of Illustrators magazine  (no. 38). It was edited by George Snow and Robert Mason and published by the Association of Illustrators in England in 1981. This issue of Illustrators magazine is notable capturing a movement in the art form of illustration, in its reactionary and rejection of popular mainstream illustration of the time.

Many contributors of Radical Illustrators were graduates of the Royal College of Art and many have since become established practitioners and teachers in the fields of illustration, moving image, fine art and writing.

In the mid-1980s, George Snow, co-editor of Radical Illustrators referenced the work of Stewart MacKinnon as “perhaps the greatest single influence on today’s Radical Illustrators.” Snow adds, "The formal construction of his work (particularly the figures) established the 'mood', which is so much a part of contemporary radicals' work."

Contributors of Radical Illustrators included:

Edward Bell
Sue Coe
Georgeanne Deen
Catherine Denvir
Terry Dowling
Blair Drawson
Robert Ellis
Carolyn Gowdy
Anne Howeson
Rod Judkins
Andrzej Klimowski
Stewart Mackinnon
Robert Mason
Shinro Ohtake
Ian Pollock
Liz Pyle
Brothers Quay
Sol Robbins
Christine Roche
George Snow
Jake Tilson

References

Visual arts magazines published in the United Kingdom
Magazines published in England
Magazines established in 1981